Ron Daws (June 21, 1937 – July 28, 1992) was a runner and 1968 Summer Olympics men's marathon athlete. Born in Minneapolis, Minnesota, he also competed at the 1967 Pan-American Games marathon and finished first in the National AAU Marathon also in 1967 on June 11.

Daws was a friend of Steve Hoag and Jim Berka.  The three often finished 1-2-3 in Minnesota races.  He was married to Lorraine Moller in the 1980s, who he later divorced.

In 1984, Daws appeared on The Mary Hanson Show (named after his wife, Mary Hanson, whom he married in October 1991). Daws died of a heart attack in 1992.

In honor of his death, in 1993, the Minnesota Distance Running Association Ron Daws 25K in Minneapolis was renamed after him.

Publications
 Self-Made Olympian, Anderson World, 1977, 
 "Marathon Training" (article), Marathoner, Spring 1978
 Running Your Best: The Committed Runner's Guide to Training and Racing, Stephen Greene Press, 1985,

References

External links
 Ron Daws, The Souhrada Family Website, retrieved 20 April 2010

1938 births
1992 deaths
American male long-distance runners
Olympic track and field athletes of the United States
Athletes (track and field) at the 1967 Pan American Games
Athletes (track and field) at the 1968 Summer Olympics
American male marathon runners
Track and field athletes from Minneapolis
20th-century American writers
20th-century American male writers
Pan American Games track and field athletes for the United States